Archibald Bishop (1829–1901) was a Canadian politician.

Archibald Bishop may also refer to:

Archie Bishop, character in The Dead (Higson novel)
Archie Bishop, character in Hawk(e): The Movie

See also
Archibald (Bishop of Moray)